The 1921 Queensland Rugby League premiership was the 13th season of the Queensland rugby league football competition. Six teams from across Brisbane competed for the premiership, which culminated in Carlton defeating Cooparoo 12-10 in the grand final

Table

Finals

Grand Final 
Carlton 12 (Tries: H. Brown, Kelly. Goals: Kelly. Field Goals: Kelly, Stallard

Cooparoo 10 (Tries: Bess, Ehler. Goals: Thorogood

References

Queensland Rugby League
Queensland Rugby League season